Lebanon is divided into nine governorates (muhafazah). Each governorate is headed by a governor (muhafiz):

All of the governorates except for Beirut and Akkar are divided into districts, which are further subdivided into municipalities.

The newest governorate is Keserwan-Jbeil, which was gazetted on 7 September 2017 but whose first governor, Pauline Deeb, was not appointed until 2020. Implementation of the next most recently created governorates, Akkar and Baalbek-Hermel, also remains ongoing since the appointment of their first governors in 2014.

See also 
 Politics of Lebanon

References

External links 

 
Lebanon 1
Governorates, Lebanon
Governorates
Subdivisions of Lebanon